Mikhail Ignatyev may refer to:

Mikhail Ignatyev (politician), second president of the Chuvash Republic, Russia
Mikhail Ignatiev (cyclist), Russian track and road bicycle racer

See also
Michael Ignatieff, Canadian politician